DATAR is a computerized battlefield information system.

DATAR or Datar may also refer to:

 Danny and Tarentella and Redanka, a musical group featuring Danny Tenaglia
 Délégation interministérielle à l'aménagement du territoire et à l'attractivité régionale, a French governmental administration

People
 Chetan Datar, an Indian playwright
 Shailesh Datar, an Indian actor
 Srikant Datar, an American economist
 Vinay Datar, one of the creators of the Datar–Mathews method for real option valuation
 Datar Kaur, a daughter of Sardar Ran Singh Nakai, the third ruler of Nakai Misl of Baherwal